Hawleyite is a rare sulfide mineral in the sphalerite group, dimorphous and easily confused with greenockite. Chemically, it is cadmium sulfide, and occurs as a bright yellow coating on sphalerite or siderite in vugs, deposited by meteoric water. 

It was discovered in 1955 in the Hector-Calumet mine, Keno-Galena Hill area, Yukon Territory and named in honour of mineralogist James Edwin Hawley (1897–1965), a professor at Queen's University in Ontario, Canada.

See also
Cadmium
Sulfide mineral
List of minerals
List of minerals named after people

References

Cadmium minerals
Sulfide minerals
Cubic minerals
Minerals in space group 216